"Something New" is the 24th and final episode of the eighth season of the CBS sitcom How I Met Your Mother, and the 184th episode overall. This was the episode that finally introduced the titular character of the Mother, played by Cristin Milioti.

Plot 
Future Ted tells his kids that, during the spring of 2013, he was making the final adjustments to the house he bought, while Barney and Robin were preparing for their wedding. As Lily and Marshall pack their things to go to Italy, Marshall's mother calls them and Lily slips the fact that they are moving. To compensate, Marshall promises her that he and his son will visit her for a week. A free Lily visits Ted in MacLaren's and he shows her his finished house.

Meanwhile, Barney and Robin sit in a bar and an obnoxious couple, Krirsten and Calvin, start bothering them – not letting them look at their cigars and stealing their reserved table. Barney and Robin start planning to break them up, so Robin puts her engagement ring in one of their champagne glasses. When Krirsten finds the ring, she excitedly responds that she will marry Calvin, but he has no intentions of doing so. After their break-up, Robin and Barney smoke happily in a park when the couple find them, saying that after the fight, they agreed to get married. Barney and Robin feel proud after seeing them happy.

When Lily and Ted reach his house, Lily realizes that Marshall's mother is trying to convince Marshall to not go to Italy, after seeing some Facebook photos. When Lily sees a "For Sale" sign, Ted reveals that he is moving to Chicago because he cannot be around Robin after the wedding. Marshall calls Lily for a final time, saying that no matter what happens, he will move to Italy with her. After this, Marshall receives a call, saying that his application to be a judge has been granted. Marshall realizes then that he cannot join Lily in Italy.

Ted reveals to Lily that after he found Robin digging her old locket only to find the empty box, she interpreted it as a sign to not marry Barney and grabbed Ted's hand. Ted left, saying that he would see her at her wedding. He realizes that after all these years, he still feels something for Robin and would do anything to make her smile. Lily admits where the locket is: before Ted almost married Stella, Lily chanced upon Robin drinking away her sorrows at Ted going ahead with his wedding. Both of them went to the park where the locket was buried and Robin found it, taking it to Ted's apartment and putting it in a race-car pencil box which she intended to take to Japan. Ted realizes he still has that box and wants to give her the locket as a wedding gift.

With the wedding scheduled in 56 hours, Ted moves out of his empty apartment and meets up with Lily to go to the wedding. When she asks how he is returning to the city before going to Chicago, Ted says that he will take the train. Ranjit picks up Robin and Barney at their apartment. Marshall calls Lily and she reminds him that in a week, they will be living in Italy. When Marshall's brother Marcus reminds him that he has not told her about the job, Marshall says that it is "face to face" news.

During a closing montage featuring all of the gang heading to Farhampton for the wedding, the titular "mother" (Cristin Milioti) is finally revealed to the audience for the first time, as she steps up to a counter at a Long Island Rail Station while carrying her signature yellow umbrella and bass guitar and asks for a ticket to Farhampton – where she will eventually meet Ted.

Production
Milioti's scene was filmed on March 27, 2013; John Lithgow helped her make the flight to Los Angeles in time for the shoot, not knowing about her role in the show.

Although the Mother only says one line, the scene was filmed in secrecy, with scripts only kept on hardcopy that were destroyed, Milioti being driven to the studio very late at night, and members of the production staff serving as extras during the train station scene. They welcomed Milioti to the stage like "Jesus has risen", show creators Carter Bays and Craig Thomas said, with the latter describing it as "a very surreal moment. It was a moment we pictured for a lot of years".

Reception

Ratings
Including DVR viewing, the episode was watched by 10.44 million viewers with an 18–49 rating of 4.5.

Critical reception

Something New received acclaim. Donna Bowman of The A.V. Club gave the episode an A−. Max Nicholson of IGN scored the episode 7.5. TV.com's Bill Kuchman described the episode as "monumental" and said that it "did a fantastic job" of keeping the show's future "under wraps", adding that the production team took a risk in casting a relatively unknown actress as the Mother. Alan Sepinwall commented on the casting of the unknown Milioti:

References

External links
 

How I Met Your Mother (season 8) episodes
2013 American television episodes